Furio De Monaco (born 14 June 1976) is a retired italian professional basketball player. He played for  1993–94 in Serie A2 and for Olimpia Basket Pistoia 1994–96 in Serie A1. De Monaco is per 2017 the Virtus TSB Cassino Team Manager, in Serie B Basket. He now resides in Italy and is a basketball coach.

See also 
 Lega Basket

References

External links 
 
 Italian Tv Interview
 Post-game interview
 Furio De Monaco becomes Team Manager

1976 births
Living people
Italian men's basketball players
People from Cassino
Pistoia Basket 2000 players
Power forwards (basketball)
Sportspeople from the Province of Frosinone